Shaktoolik is a city in Nome Census Area, Alaska, United States. At the 2010 census the population was 251, up from 230 in 2000. Shaktoolik is one of a number of Alaskan communities threatened by erosion and related global warming effects. The community has been relocated twice.

History
According to the Alaska Dept. of Community and Economic Development, Shaktoolik was the first and southernmost Malemiut settlement on Norton Sound, occupied as early as 1839. Twelve miles northwest, on Cape Denbigh, is the Iyatayet site that is 6,000 to 8,000 years old, and listed on the National Register of Historic Places. Shaktoolik was first mapped in 1842–1844 by Lt. Lavrenty Zagoskin, Imperial Russian Navy, who called it "Tshaktogmyut." "Shaktoolik" is derived from an Unaliq word, "suktuliq", meaning "scattered things".

Reindeer herds were managed in the Shaktoolik area around 1905. The village was originally located six miles up the Shaktoolik River, and moved to the mouth of the River in 1933. This site was prone to severe storms and winds, however, and the village relocated to its present, more sheltered location in 1967. There are presently only two occupied dwellings at the old townsite.  The City was incorporated in 1969.

Geography

According to the State of Alaska, Department of Community and Economic Development, Shaktoolik is located on the east shore of Norton Sound. It lies 125 miles east of Nome and 33 miles north of Unalakleet. It lies at approximately 64.333890° North Latitude and -161.153890° West Longitude.  (Sec. 23, T013S, R013W, Kateel River Meridian.)   Shaktoolik has a subarctic climate with maritime influences when Norton Sound is ice-free, usually from May to October. Summer temperatures average 47 to 62; winter temperatures average -4 to 11. Extremes from -50 to 87 have been recorded. Average annual precipitation is 14 inches, including 43 inches of snowfall.

Demographics

Shaktoolik first appeared on the 1880 U.S. Census as the unincorporated Inuit village of "Shaktolik." All 60 of its residents were Inuit. It returned in 1890 as "Shaktolit." All 38 of its residents were native. It next appeared on the 1920 census as "Shakolik." In 1930 and 1940, it returned as "Shaktolik." In 1950, it again returned as "Shaktolik" with the alternative spelling of Shaktoolik, the first time the present spelling appeared. In 1960, it reverted to "Shaktolik" and incorporated under the name in 1969. In 1980, it appeared under the present spelling again, Shaktoolik, and has continued to in every successive census.

As of the census of 2000, there were 230 people, 60 households, and 48 families residing in the city. The racial makeup of the city was 5.22% White, 94.35% Native American, and 0.43% from two or more races.

Of the 60 households, 53.3% had children under the age of 18 living with them, 58.3% were married couples living together, 8.3% had a female householder with no husband present, and 20.0% were non-families. 16.7% of all households were made up of individuals, and none had someone living alone who was 65 years of age or older.  The average household size was 3.83 and the average family size was 4.42.

In the city, the age distribution of the population shows 39.1% under the age of 18, 12.2% from 18 to 24, 25.7% from 25 to 44, 16.5% from 45 to 64, and 6.5% who were 65 years of age or older.  The median age was 24 years. For every 100 females, there were 123.3 males.  For every 100 females age 18 and over, there were 122.2 males.

The Shaktoolik economy is based on subsistence, with some part-time wage earnings. Cash jobs include commercial fishing and jobs with the City and the school. Reindeer herding also provides income and meat. Fish, crab, moose, beluga whale, caribou, seal, rabbit, geese, cranes, ducks, ptarmigan (including their eggs), berries, greens, and roots are also primary subsistence food sources.

The median income for a household in the city was $31,875, and the median income for a family was $35,000. Males had a median income of $30,313 versus $37,917 for females. The per capita income for the city was $10,491.  None of the families and 6.1% of the population were living below the poverty line, including no under eighteens and 18.8% of those over 64.

Education
Shaktoolik is served by Shaktolik School, a pre-K–12 school in the Bering Strait School District. During the school year the students of Shaktoolik have the opportunity to join sports. In the late fall there is cross country running, wrestling and volleyball. The most popular sport is basketball, which is played throughout the early winter months. Near the end of the school year the Native Youth Olympics (NYO) takes place. All the students involved in sports form a team, which travels around the Bering Strait School District (BSSD)

Notable people
Ticasuk Brown (1904–1982), Educator and writer was born in Unalakleet and wrote it about it extensively in her autobiography. Her father was one of the co-founders of the village
Félix Rodríguez de la Fuente (1928–1980), Spanish naturalist and broadcaster, died in Shaktoolik on March 14, 1980, while shooting a documentary about the Iditarod Trail Sled Dog Race, when the Cessna 185 aircraft carrying him along with two Spanish cameramen and the American pilot crashed, killing all on board

References

Archaeological sites in Alaska
Cities in Alaska
Cities in Nome Census Area, Alaska
Populated coastal places in Alaska on the Pacific Ocean